The Thirteen Buddhist Sites of Musashi（武蔵国十三仏霊場, Musashi no kuni jūsan butsu reijō）are a group of 13 Buddhist sacred sites in Saitama Prefecture, Japan. The temples are dedicated to the Thirteen Buddhas. Musashi was the previous name of Saitama. All of the temples are affiliated with Tendai Buddhism.

Directory

See also
 Thirteen Buddhas

External links
Japanese language listing

Buddhist temples in Saitama Prefecture
Buddhist pilgrimage sites in Japan